Telhio Credit Union or Telhio is a US Credit union or financial cooperative headquartered in Columbus, Ohio. Telhio is registered as a state-chartered type credit union and is the fifth largest credit union in Central Ohio. As of December 2020, Telhio has approximately $947Mil in assets, and 52,569 members. Telhio is federally insured by the National Credit Union Administration (NCUA), which insures accounts in federal and most state-chartered credit unions in the United States up to $250,000. Additionally, Telhio carries ESI Insurance, which insures personal accounts an additional $250,000, for a total of $500,000 in deposit insurance.

History
The credit union that is known as Telhio Credit Union was founded in 1934, during the national economic depression of the early 1930s (the Great Depression). Telhio was founded as the credit union for the Columbus Telephone Co. employees, but broadened its membership in 1999.

In October 2016, Telhio acquired Hamilton, Ohio based Chaco Credit Union, securing its position as the 5th largest Credit Union in the state of Ohio, ranking the 37th largest financial institution in the state.

In March 2021, Telhio secured a merger with Columbus, Ohio based Columbus Metro Federal Credit Union, increasing its membership size to over 70,000 members.

Membership
Telhio is open to anyone who lives, works, worships or goes to school in Franklin, Fairfield, Delaware, Licking, Marion, Pickaway, Union, Hamilton, Butler, Warren and Preble counties. Membership in Telhio Credit Union is limited to individuals sharing the common bond defined in its credit union charter a requirement of all credit unions.

Organization
Telhio is a not-for-profit financial cooperative where its members are also its owners. Telhio offers 12 branch offices throughout Central and Southwestern Ohio and nearly 5,000 shared branching locations nationwide.  Telhio is governed by a Board of Directors, which is made up of members elected by their peer members.

Services

Telhio offers financial products and services for both personal and business needs, including savings accounts, checking accounts, loans and certificates of deposit. Because Telhio is a financial cooperative, savings accounts are referred to as “share savings accounts” because they represent members’ ownership of the credit union. Anyone eligible for membership can become an owner of the credit union by opening an account and depositing $5.00 into a “share” savings account. Additionally, Telhio offers business loans, auto loans, mortgage loans, credit cards, lines of credit, health savings accounts, telephone banking, online banking, mobile banking, and remote deposit as well as many other services. Additionally, through a partnership with LPL Financial Services, Telhio also offers members access to retirement planning, and investment advising.

References

Credit unions based in Ohio

Companies based in the Columbus, Ohio metropolitan area